Gorno Strogomište is a village in the municipality of Kičevo, North Macedonia. It used to be part of the former Zajas Municipality.

Demographics
As of the 2021 census, Gorno Strogomište had 699 residents with the following ethnic composition:
Albanians 611
Persons for whom data are taken from administrative sources 88

According to the 2002 census, the village had a total of 1,123 inhabitants. Ethnic groups in the village include:
Albanians 1,093
Macedonians 4
Others 26

References

External links

Villages in Kičevo Municipality
Albanian communities in North Macedonia